is a Japanese actor. He is best known in the West for his roles in Friðrik Þór Friðriksson's Cold Fever and Jim Jarmusch's Mystery Train.

Nagase was described by Todd Brown of Twitch Film as "one of the great unsung heroes of Japanese film, a hugely reliable character actor with seemingly unerring taste in projects who - despite a huge body of work - remains largely unknown by name."

Career
Nagase co-starred in Jim Jarmusch's Mystery Train (1989) with Youki Kudoh. He has starred in films such as Sion Sono's Suicide Club (2001), Shinji Aoyama's Mike Yokohama: A Forest with No Name (2002), and Yoji Yamada's The Hidden Blade (2004).

Filmography

Film

 Shonben Rider (1983)
 Miyuki (1983), Masato Wakamatsu
 Mystery Train (1989)
 Bakayarou! 3: Hen na Yatsura (1990)
 My Sons (1991)
 Autumn Moon (1992)
 Tora-San Makes Excuses
 Original Sin (1992)
 The Most Terrible Time in My Life (1994)
 Outobai Shoujo (1994)
 The Stairway to the Distant Past (1994)
 Powder Road (1994)
 Cold Fever (1995)
 Flirt (1995)
 Berlin (1995)
 Trap (1996)
 Gakko II (1996)
 Niji o Tsukamu Otoko (1996)
 Ullie (1996)
 Abduction (1997)
 Beautiful Sunday (1998)
 Three Businessmen (1998)
 Gojoe (2000)
 Party 7 (2000)
 A Closing Day (2000)
 Electric Dragon 80.000 V (2001)
 Chloe (2001)
 Luxurious Bone (2001)
 Pistol Opera (2001)
 Stereo Future (2001)
 Suicide Club (2002)
 Getting Wild with Our Monkey (2002)
 Mike Yokohama: A Forest with No Name (2002)
 The Sea Is Watching (2002)
 Dead End Run (2003)
 The Loved Gun (2004)
 The Hidden Blade (2004)
 Gina K (2005)
 Ubume no Natsu (2005)
 The Blossoming of Kamiya Etsuko (2006)
 Sakuran (2006)
 Funuke Show Some Love, You Losers! (2007)
 Dreaming Awake (2008)
 R246 Story (2008)
 Gelatin Silver, Love (2009)
 Kaasan, Mom's Life (2011)
 Smuggler (2011)
 The Sea Is Watching (2012)
 A Road Stained Crimson (2012)
 A Woman and War (2013)
 Kano (2014) – Hyōtarō Kondō
 Sweet Bean (2015)
 Black Widow Business (2016) – Honda
 Jūjika (2016) – Shunsuke's father
 Happiness (2016) – Kanzaki
 64: Part I (2016)
 64: Part II (2016)
 Paterson (2016)
 Radiance (2017)
 The Blue Hearts (2017)
 Red Snow (2018)
 Vision (2018)
 Butterfly Sleep (2018)
 Punk Samurai Slash Down (2018)
 Talking the Pictures (2019)
 We Are Little Zombies (2019)
 Love's Twisting Path (2019)
 Hotel New Moon (2019)
 They Say Nothing Stays the Same (2019)
 The First Supper (2019)
 Fancy (2020)
 Sakura (2020) – Akio Hasegawa
 Just the Two of Us (2020)
 Under the Stars (2020)
 Living in the Sky (2020)
 Bolt (2020)
 Tracing Her Shadow (2020)
 Malu (2020)
 A Day with No Name (2021)
 A Madder Red (2021) – Nakamura
 Hotel Iris (2021)
 Noise (2022)
 Just Remembering (2022) – Jun
 A Hundred Flowers (2022)
 The Three Sisters of Tenmasou Inn (2022) – Kiyoshi Ogawa
 Brats, Be Ambitious! (2023) – Makio
 Mountain Woman (2023)
 Goldfish (2023) – Ichi

Television
 Abunai Deka (1987)
 Waru (1992)
 The Private Detective Mike (2002) – Mike Hama
 Bullets, Bones and Blocked Noses (2021)

Awards
 1992: Elan d'or Awards - Newcomer of the Year
 1992: Japanese Academy Awards - Best Supporting Actor and Best Newcomer (My Sons)
 2008: 29th Yokohama Film Festival - Best Supporting Actor (Funuke Show Some Love, You Losers!)
 2010: Japanese Film Critics Awards - Best Actor (Mainichi Kaasan)
 2016: 37th Yokohama Film Festival - Best Actor (An)

References

External links 
 
 
 

1966 births
Living people
Japanese male actors
Actors from Miyazaki Prefecture
People from Miyakonojō